Nakka Khurd (Urdu:نکہ خورد) is a village and union council of Jhelum District in the Punjab Province of Pakistan. Khurd and Kalan Persian language word which means small and Big respectively when two villages have same name then it is distinguished as Kalan means Big and Khurd means Small with Village Name.
It is part of Jhelum Tehsil.

Major villages
Nakka Khurd
 Chakri Rajgan
Khalaspur
Nakka Kalan
Rajroor
Jammergal
Dhok Maina jumma 
Bair Faqiran Bahnao Valey (Green Hills Village)
Pind Sawika
Noorpur

Administration
Nazim(2001–05) Maj. Azaz Ahmad Janjua of Chakri Rajgan
Nazim(2005) Malik Zia of Khalaspur
Nazim(2016) Raja Umer Shah Zaman Janjua of Chakri Rajgan. ,Doctor Ghulam Hussain x f m of pakistan jammer ghal

Notable people

General Asif Nawaz Janjua (Former Chief of Pakistan Army) of Chakri Rajgan
Major Muhammad Akram Shaheed (Nishan-e-Haider) of Nakka Kalan
Sunil Dutt Indian actor, director was born in Khurd
Nauman Qaiser, Manager MFS, Dhok Mahla

References

Populated places in Tehsil Jhelum
Union councils of Jhelum Tehsil